Sulfite oxidase is an enzyme in the mitochondria of all eukaryotes, with exception of the yeasts. It oxidizes sulfite to sulfate and, via cytochrome c, transfers the electrons produced to the electron transport chain, allowing generation of ATP in oxidative phosphorylation.  This is the last step in the metabolism of sulfur-containing compounds and the sulfate is excreted.

Sulfite oxidase is a metallo-enzyme that utilizes a molybdopterin cofactor and a heme group (in a case of animals).  It is one of the cytochromes b5 and belongs to the enzyme super-family of molybdenum oxotransferases that also includes DMSO reductase, xanthine oxidase, and nitrite reductase.

In mammals, the expression levels of sulfite oxidase is high in the liver, kidney, and heart, and very low in spleen, brain, skeletal muscle, and blood.

Structure 

As a homodimer, sulfite oxidase contains two identical subunits with an N-terminal domain and a C-terminal domain. These two domains are connected by ten amino acids forming a loop. The N-terminal domain has a heme cofactor with three adjacent antiparallel beta sheets and five alpha helices. The C-terminal domain hosts a molybdopterin cofactor that is surrounded by thirteen beta sheets and three alpha helices. The molybdopterin cofactor has a Mo(VI) center, which is bonded to a sulfur from cysteine, an ene-dithiolate from pyranopterin, and two terminal oxygens.  It is at this molybdenum center that the catalytic oxidation of sulfite takes place.

The pyranopterin ligand which coordinates the molybdenum centre via the enedithiolate. The molybdenum centre has a square pyramidal geometry and is distinguished from the xanthine oxidase family by the orientation of the oxo group facing downwards rather than up.

Active site and mechanism 

The active site of sulfite oxidase contains the molybdopterin cofactor and supports molybdenum in its highest oxidation state, +6 (MoVI).  In the enzyme's oxidized state, molybdenum is coordinated by a cysteine thiolate, the dithiolene group of molybdopterin, and two terminal oxygen atoms (oxos). Upon reacting with sulfite, one oxygen atom is transferred to sulfite to produce sulfate, and the molybdenum center is reduced by two electrons to MoIV. Water then displaces sulfate, and the removal of two protons (H+) and two electrons (e−) returns the active site to its original state. A key feature of this oxygen atom transfer enzyme is that the oxygen atom being transferred arises from water, not from dioxygen (O2).

Electrons are passed one at a time from the molybdenum to the heme group which reacts with cytochrome c to reoxidize the enzyme. The electrons from this reaction enter the electron transport chain (ETC).

This reaction is generally the rate limiting reaction. Upon reaction of the enzyme with sulfite, it is reduced by 2 electrons. The negative potential seen with re-reduction of the enzyme shows the oxidized state is favoured.

Among the Mo enzyme classes, sulfite oxidase is the most easily oxidized. Although under low pH conditions the oxidative reaction become partially rate limiting.

Deficiency 
Sulfite oxidase is required to metabolize the sulfur-containing amino acids cysteine and methionine in foods.  Lack of functional sulfite oxidase causes a disease known as sulfite oxidase deficiency. This rare but fatal disease causes neurological disorders, mental retardation, physical deformities, the degradation of the brain, and death. Reasons for the lack of functional sulfite oxidase include a genetic defect that leads to the absence of a molybdopterin cofactor and point mutations in the enzyme. A G473D mutation impairs dimerization and catalysis in human sulfite oxidase.

See also
 Sulfur metabolism
 Bioinorganic chemistry

References

Further reading

 Kisker, C. “Sulfite oxidase”, Messerschimdt, A.; Huber, R.; Poulos, T.; Wieghardt, K.; eds. Handbook of Metalloproteins, vol 2;     John Wiley and Sons, Ltd: New York, 2002

External links
 
 Research Activity of Sarkar Group
 PDBe-KB provides an overview of all the structure information available in the PDB for Human Sulfite oxidase, mitochondrial

EC 1.8.3
Metalloproteins
Molybdenum compounds